North Shore Historic District may refer to:

in the United States (by state)
 North Shore Historic District (Miami Beach, Florida), listed on the National Register of Historic Places (NRHP) in Florida
 North Shore Historic District (St. Petersburg, Florida), listed on the NRHP in Florida
Kaua'i Belt Road-North Shore section, Princeville, HI, a historic district listed on the NRHP on Kauai, Hawaii
North Shore Sanitary District Tower, Highland Park, IL, listed on the NRHP in Illinois